Nacho is a 1983 Venezuelan telenovela produced and broadcast on Venevision. It is a sequel to the 1982 telenovela Ligia Elena written by César Miguel Rondón. Alba Roversi and Guillermo Dávila reprised their roles from Ligia Elena as the main protagonists.

Plot
Ignacio Ramón Nacho Gamboa is now a famous and loved musician. But the struggles of having too much fame and fortune threaten to ruin his relationship with Ligia Elena. Nacho's new talent manager, Carlota Leonardo, is a calculating and manipulative woman who wants to win over Nacho and will do everything in her power to separate him from Ligia Elena.

Cast
 Alba Roversi as Ligia Elena Irazabal
 Guillermo Dávila as Ignacio Ramón Nacho Gamboa
 Corina Azopardo
 Manuel Poblete

References

External links

1983 telenovelas
Venevisión telenovelas
Venezuelan telenovelas
1983 Venezuelan television series debuts
1983 Venezuelan television series endings
Spanish-language telenovelas
Television shows set in Venezuela